The Artillery Ground in Finsbury is an open space originally set aside for archery and later known also as a cricket venue. Today it is used for military exercises, cricket, rugby and football matches. It belongs to the Honourable Artillery Company (HAC), whose headquarters, Armoury House, overlook the grounds.

History

Origins
Today's  site was given to the Artillery Company in 1638.

Cricket
Although the earliest definite cricket match at the Artillery Ground, between London and Surrey, took place in August 1730, it is believed to have been used to host matches as early as 1725. London used the ground regularly, as did England XIs throughout much of the 18th century. There were five matches recorded on the ground in 1731, three against Dartford and two against Croydon and the ground became the most important in the country for a time.

By the 1770s the HAC was attempting to block cricket being played on the ground, and the last significant match for over 50 years took place in 1778. Two matches which have since been given retrospective first-class cricket status: one played in 1773 and the other in 1778. Both saw England sides play Hampshire on the ground.

Cricket was restarted on the ground in 1846 but only members of the HAC were allowed to play. The HAC Cricket Club was founded in 1860.

Later history
On 15 September 1784 Vincenzo Lunardi, flew a balloon from the Artillery Ground, the first such flight in England.

The area is now used for rugby and football in the winter and cricket in the summer by HAC teams including HAC RFC. Notably, it hosted a rugby union match between Saracens and the USA national team on 9 November 2010, won 20–6 by Saracens. It is also, as a source of revenue for the HAC, rented out for parties and events including the annual Cityrace 5 km run through the city's streets.

References

1638 establishments in England
Cricket grounds in Middlesex
Cricket in Middlesex
English cricket venues in the 18th century
History of Middlesex
Honourable Artillery Company
Middlesex
Parks and open spaces in the London Borough of Islington
Sport in London
Sport in the British Army
Sports venues completed in 1730
Sports venues in London
Installations of the British Army